The following is a list of presidents of Mills College.

References

Mills College